FC Blackburn Ladies Football Club are an English women's football club affiliated with Blackburn Rovers. In 2006, they won the second tier FA Women's Premier League Northern Division and were promoted to the FA Women's Premier League National Division, where they played until relegation in the 2010–11 season. In 2018–19, they won promotion to second highest level league of English football.

History

Early days
The ladies' club was formed in 1991 as part of Blackburn Rovers' community programme, and reached the Northern Combination Women's Football League in 1998. After a few years in mid-table, the club began to take off in 2002. They moved into their parent club's lavish training facility at Brockhall Village, England youth striker Katie Anderton arrived from Tranmere Rovers and manager Marek Walsh demoted himself in favour of 25-year-old coaching prodigy Andy McNally. In 2003–04 Rovers won the Northern Combination by winning every match, and also added the Lancashire County Cup. The following season they finished a creditable third in the Premier League Northern Division.

Prior to the 2005–06 campaign, Rovers signed England Under-21 players Kay Hawke from Curzon Ashton and Lynda Shepherd from Stockport County. The club then won the league by finishing undefeated, with a record 20 wins from 22 games. McNally won FA Manager of the Year award, the first person from outside the top-flight to do so, while during the season Lynda Shepherd was called into a training camp with the senior England squad.

Women's Premier League National Division

For the club's first season at the top-level, Rovers arranged to play their home games at Clitheroe FC's Shawbridge ground. The squad was strengthened with the signing of Leeds United full-back Mel Cook and England striker Amanda Barr, from Charlton Athletic.

In October 2006 the club lost 6–3 to Chelsea in the Premier League Cup amidst farcical scenes. The controversial performance of the 20-year-old referee saw him leave Shawbridge under police escort, while Andy McNally was sent-off and subsequently banned for a month by the FA for foul and abusive language. Despite several senior players demanding his return, McNally was suspended by his employers Blackburn Rovers and replaced with Adam Lakeland in January 2007.

Although Amanda Barr also departed in January, to Leeds United, Blackburn rallied to finish in the top half of the table and reach the semi-final of the FA Women's Cup, where they lost 0–1 to Charlton Athletic. 34-goal striker Katie Anderton and goalkeeper Kay Hawke were both selected for the England squad at the end of the 2006–07 season. However, neither made the final 2007 World Cup squad. Anderton spent the summer playing in the United States, for FC Indiana.

Kay Hawke and Mel Cook signed for Lincoln City in August 2007, while former captain Anisha Bateman joined Preston North End. Lincoln goalkeeper Nicola Hobbs arrived as a replacement for Hawke. Rovers recruited several other new faces including international players Katie Williams, Michelle Walsh and Karen Burke. Natalie Preston was signed from Leeds United and captained the side in pre-season. A poor second half of the season saw Rovers finish eighth in 2007–08, while they were ejected from the FA Women's Cup by Lincoln at the quarter-final stage.

2008–09 proved no better as Rovers finished ninth and suffered a humiliating County Cup final defeat to Combination League Rochdale. Another aberrant refereeing performance in October 2008 saw four Blackburn players sent-off in a Premier League Cup defeat to Portsmouth, a scenario which manager Adam Lakeland described as "making a mockery of the women's game." In summer 2009 Rovers quit Shawbridge, citing the condition of the pitch as a contributory factor in their poor form.

2009–10 saw Blackburn playing at the Stainton Park ground of Radcliffe Borough FC and finishing seventh in the Premier League National Division.

Super League
In January 2010 Blackburn and Watford were the only top-flight clubs who failed to apply for membership of the new FA Women's Super League. In Blackburn's case the decision was related to their reluctance to separate from the men's club.

With the club back at the second level of English women's football, several players departed to Super League teams. Amy Kane and Danielle Hill returned to Everton, while Lynda Shepherd signed for Liverpool. Katie Anderton signed a Super League contract for Doncaster Rovers Belles but continued to play for Blackburn in the meantime.

Although Blackburn intended to introduce young players to their squad, they also remained active in the transfer market. Defender Charlotte Farrell and Northern Irish international midfielder Kim Turner arrived from Manchester City and versatile Amanda Goodwin signed from Curzon Ashton. In April 2011 the club parted company with Adam Lakeland, shortly before relegation into the Premier League Northern Division was confirmed.

Players

Current squad

Out on Loan

Former players

Honours
FA Women's National League North (tier 2): 2005–06; (tier 3): 2016–17, 2017–18, 2018–19
Northern Combination Women's Football League (tier 3): 2003–04
FA Women's National League play-off (tier 3): 2018–19
FA Women's National League Cup (tiers 3 and 4): 2017–18, 2018–19
Lancashire FA Women's Challenge Cup: 2003–04, 2004–05, 2005–06, 2006–2007, 2007–2008, 2009–2010, 2010–11, 2011–12, 2014–15, 2015–16, 2016–17, 2017–18, 2018–19

References

External links

Ladies' Page at Blackburn Rovers

 
Women's football clubs in England
Association football clubs established in 1991
Ladies
1991 establishments in England
FA Women's National League teams